Adjuntas is a small mountainside town and municipality in Puerto Rico located central midwestern portion of the island on the Cordillera Central, north of Yauco, Guayanilla, and Peñuelas; southeast of Utuado; east of Lares and Yauco; and northwest of Ponce. Adjuntas is spread over 16 barrios and Adjuntas Pueblo (the downtown area and the administrative center of the city). Adjuntas is about two hours by car westward from the capital, San Juan.

Adjuntas is nicknamed "the Switzerland of Puerto Rico", because of its relatively chilly weather. Many Puerto Rican mountain towns have cooler weather than the rest of the island; Adjuntas is no exception: the average yearly weather is 70 °F (21 °C) (High: 83 °F/28 °C; Low: 58 °F/14 °C). Puerto Rico's lowest temperature were recorded in Adjuntas at 38 °F in 2018. Its mild climate attracts a good number of island tourists during the summer months. The town has a small hotel named Monte Rio and a good-sized parador, or country inn, called Villa Sotomayor.

Adjuntas' ZIP Code, 00601, is the lowest standard ZIP code in the United States ZIP code system.

Etymology and nicknames 

The name Adjuntas literally translates to "attached" in Spanish. The name is most likely a shortening of "tierras adjuntas a Coamo" or 'lands attached (or in proximity) to Coamo" as the territory was originally part of the lands of Villa de San Blas de Illescas, one of the oldest settlements in Puerto Rico, which the municipality gained autonomy from in 1739.

The municipality has received numerous nicknames throughout its history, such as La Ciudad del Gigante Dormido, Spanish for "city of the sleeping giant" after the mountain that overlooks the town; La Suiza de Puerto Rico ("Puerto Rico's Switzerland") due to its relative cool temperatures and mountainous terrain; and La Tierra de los Lagos ("Land of the Lakes") after the many natural pools or charcas that are formed by the numerous rivers that flow through the municipality.

History
Although there are petroglyphs and traces of Taíno people in Adjuntas, there is no proof that the region was dominated by any specific cacique. Nearby caciques like Guarionex and Urayoán could have had some control over the area.

According to historian Aurelio Tió, during the Spanish colonization of Puerto Rico in the 16th century, it is believed that a Spanish interpreter called Juan González settled in the region. Also, historian Cayetano Coll y Toste wrote a legend about Spanish people looking for gold in the region of Adjuntas.

As colonization progressed, Adjuntas became part of the San Blas de Illescas (Coamo village), which was founded in 1579 and became the most important settlement in the south. It is believed that the name "Adjuntas" derives from the term of "being close" to Coamo. As population shifted to Ponce, Adjuntas became more linked to that town, and then to Utuado, being a barrio of this municipality in 1739.

With 20 families established in the region, the residents of Adjuntas asked for the settlement to be officially recognized. The town of Adjuntas was then founded on August 11, 1815, with Diego Maldonado being elected as its representative. A city hall and public square were built shortly after.

Adjuntas was one of the main cities where the Anusim, Maranos, and other Sephardi Jews settled in Puerto Rico. Many of these were of the Torres, Perez or Peretz, and Bennazar families among others. Berberena and Mozarabes settled there too.

Taíno families from neighboring Utuado can also be found in this area, along with escaped cimarrones, or African slaves, who intermarried with the Taíno. DNA genetic evidence shows that many Africans fled up the Camino Real into the mountains to escape the sugar plantations of Ponce. The Mandinka, Wolof & Fulani mtDNA African haplotype, L1b, is present here. Taíno haplogroups A & C can also be found in this area.

After the mid-19th century, Adjuntas welcomed many immigrants from the Mediterranean islands Corsica and Majorca. Some of them established coffee plantations. During the last decades of the 19th century, the coffee produced in Adjuntas was exported to Europe, United States and even the Vatican.

Adjuntas was proclaimed a "villa", or a first order municipality, by the Spanish Government Monarchy in 1894. Several years after, the town was occupied by the United States Army forces during the Spanish–American War of 1898 and was visited by President Theodore Roosevelt in 1906.

The discovery of rich deposits of copper, gold and other minerals during the 1960s motivated some local community and environmental leaders to oppose the mining. Casa Pueblo, a local community organization settled in Adjuntas, opposed to the mining and advocates for the preservation of natural resources in Puerto Rico.

In 1992, Southern Gold Resources, a US company, was granted permission to explore for gold in Adjuntas and Utuado, Puerto Rico.

Hurricane Maria on September 20, 2017, triggered numerous landslides all across Adjuntas, with its winds and significant amount of rain, 18.38 inches in Adjuntas. The hurricane winds and rain damaged infrastructure and the electrical system of Adjuntas collapsed leaving its over 18,000 residents with no electrical power. PR-10 which connects Adjuntas to Utuado collapsed by 9 feet, and according to the mayor of Adjuntas, 1500 homes were completely destroyed. Nearly 62% of the residents of Adjuntas were already living below the poverty level when Hurricane María hit Puerto Rico. The municipality was also affected by the 2020 earthquakes which caused landslides and power outages in the region.

Folklore

El Gigante Dormido ("the sleeping giant") is a mountain (Cerro El Gigante) and panoramic view that resembles the shape of a man lying on his back, the profile of his face is reflected in the mountain ridges of Adjuntas. Legend says that many years ago a sole resident lived in the region, and he was a giant. The people wanted to live in those fertile lands, but they would observe the giant stretching his arms widely over the area, even peeping his head over the mountain peaks. A witch learned that to kill the giant she would have to hit him in his right eye with a poisoned arrow, which she did one day as he stood up. Being hit in the eye, the giant leapt in pain and fell flat on his back but not before punching the ground hard and that formed an area from where water foamed up. Eventually, the giant on his back became petrified in that position forming the panorama of the profile of his face.

Geography
The terrain of Adjuntas is very mountainous due to its location in the Cordillera Central. It borders Utuado in the north and east, Lares and Yauco to the west, and Guayanilla, Peñuelas, and Ponce to the south.

Historian Pedro Tomás de Córdova described the terrain as "high, and mountainous, and very healthy". He also praised the quality of the terrain for agriculture. Adjuntas' highest peak is Monte Guilarte (3,773 ft; 1,150 m), followed by Vaquiñas (3,346 ft; 1,020 m). Guilarte itself is the sixth highest peak in Puerto Rico and is located in Guilarte State Forest. Córdova also mentioned the water features, describing 26 rivers and 16 creeks that ran through the region.

Bodies of water
The following rivers flow through Adjuntas: Río Cidra, Río Corcho, Rio de la Ciénaga, Río Garzas, Río Guilarte, Río Limaní, Río Saltillo, Río Toro, Río Vacas, and Río Yahuecas. There aren't any beaches in Adjuntas given that it is landlocked.

Barrios

The municipality of Adjuntas is made up of 17 barrios, including the barrio-pueblo.

 Adjuntas barrio-pueblo
 Capáez
 Garzas
 Guayabo Dulce
 Guayo
 Guilarte
 Juan González
 Limaní
 Pellejas
 Portillo
 Portugués
 Saltillo
 Tanamá
 Vegas Abajo
 Vegas Arriba
 Yahuecas
 Yayales

Sectors
Barrios (which are like minor civil divisions) and subbarrios, in turn, are further subdivided into smaller local populated place areas/units called sectores (sectors in English). The types of sectores may vary, from normally sector to urbanización to reparto to barriada to residencial, among others.

Climate

Adjuntas features a tropical rainforest climate that borders on a subtropical highland climate. While the town technically features a tropical rainforest climate, due to its high elevation, the climate is noticeably cooler than the norm for this climate category. Summers are warm (83°-85 °F) in the daytime and mild at nighttime (60°-63 °F).
Meanwhile, winters are moderately warm with cool temperatures at night. Adjuntas' summer climate is comparable to higher altitude locations near the equator (albeit with warmer winters), such as Medellin, while its winters are comparable to higher latitude locations at the limit of the tropics such as West Palm Beach.

Demographics

In 2020, Adjuntas had a population of 18,020.

80% of the per capita income of Adjuntas is a product of agriculture. In 2010, unemployment hit 20.2%. According to mayor, Jaime Barlucea, it decreased to 18.7 in 2011. However, according to the Department of Employment of Puerto Rico, it increased to 21.3.

The municipality of Adjuntas previously formed the Adjuntas Micropolitan Statistical Area, and it has been included in the Ponce Metropolitan Statistical Area since the 2020 US Census.

Special Communities

 (Special Communities of Puerto Rico) are marginalized communities whose citizens are experiencing a certain amount of social exclusion. A map shows these communities occur in nearly every municipality of the commonwealth. Of the 742 places that were on the list in 2014, the following barrios, communities, sectors, or neighborhoods were in Adjuntas: Acueducto neighborhood, Calle del Agua, Guayo barrio, Rullán neighborhood, Saltillo Vaca, Tanamá barrio, and Yahuecas barrio.

Economy

Agriculture

Since its foundation in the 19th century, the production of coffee, sugarcane, small fruits, and cattle have formed the foundation of the economy of Adjuntas. During the middle of the 20th century, however, the production of sugar declined with the arrival of manufacturing industries.

Adjuntas is still the main producer of coffee on the island. Other products produced in Adjuntas are tropical crops such as bananas, citron and peaches.

After the economic hardships caused by Hurricane Maria in 2017, some economic gains were being made by a number of women working in agriculture in Adjuntas.

Industry
During the middle of the 20th century, some manufacturing industries established themselves in town as part of Operation Bootstrap. However, as of 2012, most of them have already closed. One of the last manufacturing companies in town, a military uniforms company, closed in March 2012.

Tourism
Although tourism hasn't been an integral part of the economy of Adjuntas, according to historic records, it has been present since the 19th century. Historian Lidio Cruz Monclóva noted that around 1871, some doctors requested patients to travel to Adjuntas to stay in a hotel called "La Adjunteña". The hotel was the property of C.L. Ginestre, and served both tourists and the sick. Cruz noted that doctors believed the colder temperatures of the town were beneficial to health.

In 2018, Adjuntas received approximately 700 tourists on weekends, according to mayor Jaime Barlucea. Most of them want to visit the haciendas established there during past centuries. Some of them are: Hacienda Don Juan, Hacienda Bareal, Hacienda El Muerto, Hacienda Arbela, and Hacienda Pietri. Other landmarks are Monte Guilarte, and the Inabón waterfall.

Another known tourist stop in Adjuntas is Casa Pueblo, a local museum and cultural institution founded by a group of activists that fought against the copper mine exploitation of the area for decades. Casa Pueblo is responsible for many environmental projects, namely the preservation of hundreds of acres of woods and bodies of water.

However, some residents and businesspeople from Adjuntas maintain that the government has not taken advantage of the many tourist attractions in town, which include three forests, waterfalls, lakes, and many renowned restaurants. One of the projects that has received media coverage is the Castillo de los Niños, built during the mayoralty of Barlucea. Castillo de los Niños is a recreational park resembling a castle, with gazebos.

Villa Sotomayor is a parador, featuring ecotourism. Villa Sotomayor features food prepared with local ingredients, from a nearby estate .

In early 2021, in alliance with neighboring Lares, Adjuntas launched agri-tourism for tourists to visit haciendas where coffee is grown and processed.

There are two places in Adjuntas recognized for their historic significance: Las Cabañas Bridge, a one-lane bridge made of steel and concrete, which was built in 1919, and Quinta Vendrell, a country house built in 1918. The Washington Irving Grade School was also added to the US National Register of Historic Places in 2015.

To stimulate local tourism during the COVID-19 pandemic in Puerto Rico, the Puerto Rico Tourism Company launched the Voy Turistiendo (I'm Touring) campaign in 2021. The campaign featured a passport book with a page for each municipality.

Human resources

Education
In all of the island's municipalities, public education is overseen by the Puerto Rico Department of Education. When Puerto Rico was ceded by Spain in the aftermath of the Spanish–American War under the terms of the Treaty of Paris of 1898 and became a territory of the United States, there were already six public schools established in Adjuntas. Historian Cayetano Coll y Toste offered a detailed account of each of them, including the number of students, which at the time totaled 402.

As of 2018–2019 the following public schools were operational in Adjuntas:
Domingo Massol is a rural, elementary school located in Saltillo barrio, offering grades K – 6 with about 114 students.
Domingo Pietri Ruiz is an urban, elementary school offering K – 3 grades with about 425 students.
Rafael Aparicio Jimenez is an urban, intermediate school offering grades 7 – 9 with about 385 students.
Hector I Rivera is a rural school located in Yahuecas barrio, offering K – 8 with about 240 students.
Jose Emilio Lugo is an urban, high school located in Urbanización Cerros, offering grades 10 – 12 with over 600 students.
Jose B. Barcelo Oliver is a rural school for adults located in Saltillo barrio.

Public health
Although there are no hospitals in Adjuntas, the town does have a small treatment and diagnostic center located in Adjuntas Pueblo. Also, Castañer Hospital, which is located on the border between Adjuntas, Lares, and Maricao, offers services to the municipality.

Public safety
According to sources, there has not been a murder in Adjuntas since 2009. However, burglary and theft have increased. Some residents attribute the rise in crime to unemployment and the lack of activities for the youth.

Culture

Festivals and events
Adjuntas celebrates its patron saint festival in late July / early August. The  is a religious and cultural celebration in honor of Saint Joachim and Saint Anne. The festival generally features parades, games, artisans, amusement rides, regional food, and live entertainment.

Other festivals and events celebrated in Adjuntas include:
 
  – February / March
 El Gigante Marathon – July
 Cidra Festival – August
  – August
 Eduardo Vera Marathon – December
 Troubadour Contest – December
  – December
 Businesswomen from the Mountain Market once a month

Sports 
The town has a professional volleyball team called Gigantes de Adjuntas that plays on the LVSM in Puerto Rico. The team won a title in 1973.

Transportation

In 1874, General José Laureano Sanz, Governor of Puerto Rico, sponsored a road from Ponce to Arecibo, going across Adjuntas and Utuado. In 1885, it is believed that the road was under construction.

Nowadays, the main road to Adjuntas is PR-10, that connects the cities of Ponce in the south and Arecibo in the north, going across Adjuntas in the center. Before the PR-10 was built, roads like the PR-123, and other small roads were used to reach town.

There is also a small airport in Adjuntas that caters to private airplanes.

Adjuntas has 30 bridges. Built in 1919, Las Cabañas Bridge, made of steel and concrete is a one-lane, historic bridge which remains in operation.

Government

All municipalities in Puerto Rico are administered by a mayor, elected every four years. As of 2021, the mayor of Adjuntas is José Hiram Soto Rivera, of the Popular Democratic Party (PPD). The mayor before him was Jaime Barlucea. Barlucea has been reelected three times since (2008, 2012, and 2016).

The city belongs to the Puerto Rico Senatorial district V, which is represented by two senators. In 2016, Luis A. Berdiel Rivera and Nelson Cruz, from the New Progressive Party, were elected as district senators.

Symbols 
The  has an official flag and coat of arms.

Coat of Arms 
The coat of arms of Adjuntas is divided in two. The left side features a shepherd's staff crossed with a yarnwinder in a purple field. They symbolize the Old Testament patriarchs, representing Saint Joachim and Saint Anne, parents of the Virgin Mary. An eight-pointed star sits above them representing the Virgin.

The right side of the coat of arms is divided in three fields. The upper and lower field have green crosses in white fields. The crosses, known as "flory or fleury" are also present in the symbols of Coamo, because of the relationship between both towns. Two bells lie in the middle field, also a representation of the name of "Adjuntas".

Two coffee branches surround the coat of arms, representing Adjuntas location and its importance in the coffee industry of the island. The castle at the top represents the title of village given to Adjuntas by Spain in 1894.

Flag 
The flag of Adjuntas has similar symbolisms. A white diagonal stripe divides the flag in two triangles. The upper one is purple, while the lower one is green. In the middle of each triangle lies a white "cross fleury". The white color symbolizes purity, while purple represents Saint Joachim's cloth and green the nature of the town.

Anthem 
The anthem of Adjuntas was written by José Nieves Pérez and is called "Adjuntas, mi amor".

Nicknames 
Adjuntas has several nicknames. One is "" ("The city of the sleeping giant"). This is a reference to one of the mountains of the city, which is compared to a "sleeping giant". Another nickname is "" ("The Switzerland of Puerto Rico") which is a reference to Adjuntas' relatively low temperatures. Adjuntas has an average yearly weather of 70 degrees Fahrenheit. Finally, Adjuntas is also called "" ("The land of lakes") because of its many lakes.

Notable Adjunteños
Among the notable Adjunteños are the following:
 Aristides A. Moll Boscana – Poet, writer, translator and politician. He was the first Puerto Rican to write a complete modernista poetry book: Mi misa rosa (1905). In United States he worked as a technical writer for the federal government, as a translator of the first Spanish-language edition of the Journal of the American Medical Association, and as Secretary of the Pan American Sanitary Bureau in Washington, DC, where he edited the Latin American edition of its bulletin. He participated of many Latin American public health conferences, the first World Health Organization conference in Paris, France, and represented El Salvador during the WHO constitutional conference in New York. He wrote many public health related essays and prepared two bilingual (Spanish – English) medical dictionaries and a Spanish medical manual for physicians. He published Æsculapius in Latin America, (a History of Medicine in the Americas).
 César Luis González – The first Puerto Rican pilot in the United States Army Air Forces and the first Puerto Rican pilot to die in World War II. His name is listed on the "Roll of Honor" of the 314th Troop Carrier Group World War II and Adjuntas has honored his memory by naming a street, after him.
 Norman Maldonado – One of Puerto Rico's leading hematologists and former president of the University of Puerto Rico.
 Ismael Alicea – Librarian who worked at the New York Public Library for many years.

See also

 List of Puerto Ricans
 History of Puerto Rico

References

Further reading
 
 Mi Pueblo Adjuntas, 1992, by Rafael J. Mirabal-Linares
 Entre Fotos y Palabras, 2005 by Rafael J. Mirabal-Linares
 Mi misa rosa, 2013, by Arístides A. Moll Boscana, with a preliminary essay by Ramón Luis Acevedo Marrer

External links 
 
 AdjuntasPR.com

 
Municipalities of Puerto Rico
Populated places established in 1815
1815 establishments in Puerto Rico